Lommel is a municipality and a city in the Belgian province of Limburg. The Kempen city has about 34,000 inhabitants and is part of the electoral district and the judicial district Lommel Neerpelt.

Besides residential town of Lommel also has a number of nature reserves, such as the nature reserve De Watering, the Lommel Sahara, and numerous forests and heathlands. Lommel is the third shopping city in Belgian Limburg with a commercial and shopping center De Singel. Importantly, the silver sand that is mined here for the benefit of the glass industry. Some sand mining quarries are transformed into nature reserves and recreational areas, including Lommel Sahara.

The city of Lommel is the watershed of the basins of the Scheldt, and Meuse, and within these basins Nete Dommel respectively.

Language 

The dialect of Lommel – the Lommel – is part of the East Brabant, and not to the West Limburg dialects, reflecting the particular history of the place.

Etymology 
The name comes from Lommel Loemelo. Loem means moist, swampy and Lo is forest or woodland.

Demographic development 
All historical data relating to the current municipality, including towns such as arose after the merger of January 1, 1977.

Politics

Structure 
The city of Lommel is located in the electoral district Neerpelt (which is identical to the county district Neerpelt) and the electoral district Hasselt Tongeren-Maaseik (same as the constituency Limburg).

List of mayors of Lommel 
 1808 – 1813: Joannes Aerts, Catholic
 1813 – 1847: William Karel Koek Court, Catholic
 1847 – 1857: Jan Daels, Catholic
 1857 – 1861: Jan Van Leemput, Catholic
 1861 – 1863: Henry Alen, Catholic
 1863 – 1872: Peter Slegers, Catholic
 1872 – 1879: Peter Stevens, Catholic
 1879 – 1885: Jan Alen, Catholic
 1885 – 1890: Jan Vanden Boer, Catholic
 1891 – 1904: Peter Senders, Catholic
 1904 – 1921: François Van Ham, Catholic
 1921 – 1923: John Bouly, Catholic
 1924 – 1927: Peter Joosten, Catholic
 1927 – 1941: Joseph Tournier, liberal Catholics
 1941 – 1944: Peter Luykx, Flemish nationalist
 1944 – 1945: Joseph Tournier, liberal Catholics
 1945 – 1958: Henri Van Reempts, Catholic
 1959 – 1979: René Verhoeven, Catholic
 1979 – 1988: Staff Matthijs, Catholic
 1989 – 2006: Louis Vanvelthoven, socialist
 2007 – 2018: Peter Vanvelthoven, socialist
 2019–present: Bob Nijs, Catholic

Results municipal elections since 1976 

seats formed coalition  'bold'  printed

Sport events 
Since 2017 the European Open a Snooker ranking tournament of the World Snooker Tour took place in Lommel.

Notable people from Lommel 
 Kevin Hulsmans, road bicycle racer
 Peter Luykx, federal representative 
 Peter Maes, former soccer player, coach of Sporting Lokeren
 Roy Meeus (born 1989), professional footballer
 Wim Mennes, soccer player
 Pieter Mertens, road bicycle racer
 Steve Ramon, motocross world champion
 Kathleen Smet, athlete in triathlon
 Dirk Swartenbroekx, DJ Buscemi
 Johan Vansummeren, road bicycle racer
 Marcel Vanthilt, musician, TV presenter
 Louis Vanvelthoven, honorary-mayor, former chairman of the Flemish Parliament
 Peter Vanvelthoven, mayor, former Belgian Minister for Employment and Informatisation
 Steven Van Broeckhoven, professional windsurfer, two-time champion on the European Freestyle Pro Tour

See also
Lommel Proving Grounds – Lommel Proving Grounds
Lommel German war cemetery – Located along N764, on the road from Lommel to Leopoldsdorp is the largest German military cemetery in Western Europe outside Germany itself. Established after World War II, the 16 ha cemetery holds 39,102 burials, mainly from World War II.

References

External links

Official website
Website tourism Lommel
Steven van Broeckhoven´s profile on efpt.net

 
Municipalities of Limburg (Belgium)